"Welcome Back" is a popular record that was the theme song of the 1970s American television sitcom Welcome Back, Kotter. Written and recorded by former Lovin' Spoonful frontman John Sebastian, it reached No. 1 on the Billboard Hot 100 chart for one week in May 1976 after only five weeks on the chart, and also topped the adult contemporary chart (the show itself had become an instant ratings success upon its premiere the previous fall). It also reached No. 93 on the country chart.

History
TV producer Alan Sachs wanted a Lovin' Spoonful-like theme song for a new ABC sitcom entitled Kotter.

Chart performance

Weekly charts

Year-end charts

In popular culture
The song is featured twice in the Marvel Cinematic Universe (MCU) film Ant-Man and the Wasp: Quantumania (2023). It is first used in an opening montage depicting Scott Lang's (portrayed by Paul Rudd) life following the events of Avengers: Endgame (2019), and is used again in a similar montage at the end of the film after Lang and his family escape from the Quantum Realm and defeat Kang the Conqueror (portrayed by Jonathan Majors).

Other versions
Northern California experimental band Mr. Bungle covered the song on January 13, 1992, in back-to-back English and Spanish versions, at The Berkeley Square in Berkeley, California.
Canadian country music artist Chris Cummings covered the song in 2009 and released his version as a single. The version was later included on his 2010 album Give Me Tonight.
The song was sampled by rapper Lupe Fiasco for his song "Welcome Back Chilly", rapper Mase for his song "Welcome Back", hip hop group Onyx in their song "Slam Harder", and by rapper AZ for his song "Once Again".
 Swedish dream pop group jj recorded a version of the song in 2009. This version of the song is used in the trailer for the second season of MTV's Scream.
 The song is often used by Atlanta Braves organist Matthew Kaminski for former Braves players when they are at bat for their current team.
 The artist Rumer recorded it for her 2012 album Boys Don't Cry.
 On May 1, 2020, Count Bass D released a cover of the song on his Bandcamp site, commenting, "This take is a nod to the light at the end of this Coronavirus tunnel. It's a peaceful piano rendition aimed to help with the stress of these times."

See also
List of Hot 100 number-one singles of 1976 (U.S.)
List of number-one adult contemporary singles of 1976 (U.S.)

References

External links
[ Song review]
 

1976 singles
John Sebastian songs
Chris Cummings songs
Billboard Hot 100 number-one singles
Cashbox number-one singles
Songs written by John Sebastian
Comedy television theme songs
1976 songs
Reprise Records singles